"The Chorus Girl" is an 1886 short story by Anton Chekhov.

Publication
The story was first published in Oskolkis No. 14 (18 July), 1886 issue, originally titled Pevichka (Певичка). In a radically revised version the story was included into the Posrednik Publishers' 1893 charitable anthology Put-doroga (Путь-дорога, Long Road, for the benefit of the re-settlers in Russia). Chekhov made some more edits in the text before including it into Volume 2 of his Collected Works, published by Adolf Marks in 1899–1901.

During the first revision Chekhov made changes so as to make the story more serious. His attitude towards his heroine by this time, apparently, had totally changed. "Out of a humorous episode of the life of a promiscuous woman he made a lyrical, sad story of a harshly done by, deeply insulted human being," the critic E.A. Polotskaya argued.

Plot summary
The singer Pasha's quiet evening together with her 'fan' Kolpakov is interrupted by a mysterious visitor, who soon reveals herself to be the latter's wife. She first demands to see her husband (who'd by now hid in another room), then barrages Pasha with insults and finally demands that she'd return all the gifts that he'd given her, so as to collect the sum of money he appears to have embezzled. Scared and overwhelmed, the girl gives all the presents that she’d received from all of her male 'guests', of which only two very modest items had been brought by Kolpakov. After the woman, still rather dissatisfied with what she'd collected, leaves, Pasha tries to reproach her lover, only to be confronted with disdain and high posturing. "And this saintly woman was on the verge of throwing herself on her knees before a lowly worm like you!.. For this, I shall never forgive myself," he proclaims before departing in disgust.

Notes

References

External links
 Хористка, the original Russian text
 The Chorus Girl, two English translations on Wikisource
 

Short stories by Anton Chekhov
1886 short stories
Works originally published in Russian magazines